Vía X is a Chilean pay television channel, owned by TVI Filmocentro Televisión. It airs mostly rock music videos, mainly focusing in the Chilean indie subculture. It also has programs focusing on K-Dramas and K-Pop, and talk shows. Its sister station is Zona Latina, which airs Spanish-language music videos.

See also
List of Chilean television channels

External links
 Official Site 

Television networks in Chile
Television stations in Chile
Music television channels
Spanish-language television stations
Television channels and stations established in 1994
Companies based in Santiago
Music organisations based in Chile